"Anybody" is a song by American rapper Young Thug featuring Nicki Minaj. The track was released as the lead single from Young Thug's extended play Hear No Evil on April 13, 2018, alongside the EP.

Music video 
The official music video for the track was released on April 13, 2018, and is done entirely in sign language.

Critical reception 
Sheldon Pearce of Pitchfork said that the track "falls well short of his usual standard", and called it "lazily rapped".

Charts

Certifications

References 

Young Thug songs
Songs written by Young Thug
2018 singles
Nicki Minaj songs
Songs written by Nicki Minaj
2018 songs